Nuestra Belleza Jalisco 2010, was held at the Auditorio Telmex in Guadalajara, Jalisco on July 23, 2010. At the conclusion of the final night of competition, Karin Ontiveros of Amatitan was crowned the winner. Ontiveros was crowned by outgoing Nuestra Belleza Jalisco 2009 Janeth Perez and Miss Universe 2010, Ximena Navarrete. Twelve contestants competed for the state title.
The pageant was hosted by  Carlos Anaya y Paola Velazco.

Results

Placements

Judges
Néstor Daniel - singer
Sergio Bustamante - celebrity plastic surgeon
Karla Carrillo - Nuestra Belleza México 2008 and  Miss Continente Americano 2010 1st runner-up
Óscar "El espectáculo" - comedian
Martha Zavaleta' - television host
Álvaro Álvarez - model

Background music
David Guetta
Carina Ricco
José Luis Altamirano

Contestants

References

External links

Nuestra Belleza México